Florian Bergér (born 31 March 1989) is German pilot. He is a co-pilot of A320 in Lufthansa and a pilot of the Challenger class of the Red Bull Air Race World Championship.

Biography 
Florian Bergér is the first German ever to claim the Challenger Cup title and the only pilot of any nationality to have earned the honour twice. Against the most competitive field yet, he's looking for a hat-trick in 2018, all the while working toward his ultimate goal: securing a spot in the Master Class.

"The first time I got in touch with aviation was when my father took me for a ride. He's a pilot as well," remembers Bergér, who was born in Eichstätt in 1989. "Ever since, I've been fascinated by aviation."

Bergér began his career by piloting gliders and still cross-trains with them when time permits, in addition to flying the A320 as a First Officer for Lufthansa. He received his foundational aerobatic training at the flying school of champion Red Bull Air Race pilot Matthias Dolderer in Tannheim, and has been representing his country at international competitions since 2014. Successes include third place in the team competition at the European Aerobatic Championships and several individual medals in the Unlimited category at German Nationals, including Vice German Aerobatic Champion (2016) and German Aerobatic Champion (2018 and 2019).

When Bergér joined the Challenger Class in 2015, he was one of the youngest pilots ever to fly in the Red Bull Air Race. Eager to expand his Air Racing skills, over his first three seasons he clinched a total of 10 race podiums. Highlights include his maiden race win in Spielberg, Austria, and victory at his very first home race at Germany's EuroSpeedway Lausitz, both in 2016. The wins continued in 2017, when he topped the podium at the stop in San Diego, USA, and triumphed in Budapest, Hungary, the spiritual home of the Red Bull Air Race. Bergér's experience will continue to grow throughout the 2018 season, as he masters the new raceplane for the Challenger Class – an Edge 540 V2.

In 2015, he joined the Red Bull Air Race as Challenger class pilot. He won the Challenger class in 2016 and 2017.

Results

Red Bull Air Race

Challenger Class 

Legend: * CAN: Cancelled * DNP: Did not take part * DNS: Did not start * DSQ: Disqualified

References

External links
 

1989 births
Living people
German aviators
German air racers
Red Bull Air Race World Championship pilots
Aerobatic pilots
Commercial aviators